Heimo Nestori Rekonen (8 August 1920, Lestijärvi – 24 November 1997) was a Finnish politician. He was a member of the Parliament of Finland from 1970 to 1979, representing the Finnish People's Democratic League (SKDL).

References

1920 births
1997 deaths
People from Lestijärvi
Communist Party of Finland politicians
Finnish People's Democratic League politicians
Members of the Parliament of Finland (1970–72)
Members of the Parliament of Finland (1972–75)
Members of the Parliament of Finland (1975–79)